The Province of Alberta currently has 255 urban municipalities including 19 cities, 105 towns, 80 villages and 51 summer villages. In addition, there are 102 communities that previously held some form of urban municipality status. These include 2 former cities, 18 former towns, 2 former new towns, 81 former villages, and 1 former summer village. These communities no longer exist as independent urban municipalities due to amalgamation, annexation or dissolution.

List

See also 
2000–06 municipal reorganization in Quebec
2002–2006 municipal reorganization of Montreal
Amalgamation of the Halifax Regional Municipality
Amalgamation of Toronto
Amalgamation of Winnipeg
Edmonton annexations
List of communities in Alberta
List of municipal amalgamations in Alberta
List of municipal amalgamations in New Brunswick
List of municipalities in Alberta
Manitoba municipal amalgamations, 2015

References 

 
History of Alberta
Local government in Alberta
Municipalities